W. Casperson House is a historic home located at St. Georges, New Castle County, Delaware.  It was built about 1835, and is a -story, five bay brick dwelling with a center hall plan.  It has a low two-story wing.  Both sections have a gable roof with dormers.

It was added to the National Register of Historic Places in 1982.

References

Houses on the National Register of Historic Places in Delaware
Houses completed in 1835
Houses in New Castle County, Delaware
National Register of Historic Places in New Castle County, Delaware